The Aizi (Aïzi, Ahizi, Ezibo) speak three languages around Ébrié Lagoon in Ivory Coast.

Two of the languages are Kru. They are divergent enough for intelligibility to be difficult:
Lélé (Lélémrin), also known as Tiagba (Tiagbamrin) after its principal town
Mobu (Mobumrin)

It was long assumed that the third ethnically Aizi language, Apro ("Aproumu"), was Kru as well. However, now that it has been documented, Apro is classified as a Kwa language.

References

Kru languages
Languages of Ivory Coast